In mathematics, the term fiber (US English) or fibre (British English) can have two meanings, depending on the context:

 In naive set theory, the fiber of the element  in the set  under a map  is the inverse image of the singleton  under 
 In algebraic geometry, the notion of a fiber of a morphism of schemes must be defined more carefully because, in general, not every point is closed.

Definitions

Fiber in naive set theory

Let  be a function between sets.

Fiber in algebraic geometry

 
where  is the residue field at

Fibers in topology

Every fiber of a local homeomorphism is a discrete subspace of its domain. 
If  is a continuous function and if  (or more generally, if ) is a T1 space then every fiber is a closed subset of  

A function between topological spaces is called  if every fiber is a connected subspace of its domain. A function  is monotone in this topological sense if and only if it is non-increasing or non-decreasing, which is the usual meaning of "monotone function" in real analysis. 

A function between topological spaces is (sometimes) called a  if every fiber is a compact subspace of its domain. However, many authors use other non-equivalent competing definitions of "proper map" so it is advisable to always check how a particular author defines this term. 

See also

 Fibration
 Fiber bundle
 Fiber product
 Preimage theorem
 Zero set

Citations

References

 

Basic concepts in set theory
Mathematical relations